The 2021–22 AdmiralBet ABA League is the 21st season of the ABA League with 14 teams from Bosnia and Herzegovina, Croatia, Montenegro, Serbia and Slovenia participating in it.

Teams

Promotion and relegation 
A total of 14 teams contest the league in the 2021–22 season (and until the 2024–25 season), including the 13 highest-placed teams from the previous season and the winner of the 2020–21 ABA League Second Division.

Promoted
 SC Derby – 2020–21 ABA 2 Champions

Relegated
 Koper Primorska –  disqualified from the competition in December 2020.

Venues and locations

Personnel and sponsorship

Coaching changes

Referees
A total of 55 ABA officials set to work on the 2021–22 season in ABA 1 and ABA 2:

Regular season 
The regular season commenced on 25 September 2021.

League table

Positions by round

Results

Results by round 
The table lists the results of teams in each round.

Playoffs 

On 13 September 2021, the ABA League JTD decided that six highest-placed clubs from the Regular season will qualify for the Playoffs.

Preliminary Round

Semifinals

Finals

Relegation Playoffs 
The 13th placed team of the First Division season and the runners-up of the Second Division season should play in the Qualifiers for a spot in the next First Division season. That team should have been Split.

However, because of the rule that no more than 5 teams from the same country could participate in ABA league, and since Serbian team Zlatibor is the champion of the ABA League Second Division, relegation playoffs will be played between them and the lowest ranked Serbian team in the ABA League First Division (Borac Čačak).

Results 

|}

Game 1

Game 2

Statistics

Individual statistic leaders

| width=50% valign=top |

Points

 

|}

|}

| width=50% valign=top |

Assists

  

 
|}
|}
Only players who played more than 66% of total league games are included 
Source: ABA League

Awards

MVP List

MVP of the Round

Source: ABA League

MVP of the Month

Average home attendances

Clubs in European competitions

See also 

 List of current ABA League First Division team rosters
 2021–22 ABA League Second Division
 2021–22 Junior ABA League
 2021–22 WABA League

ABA teams
 2021–22 KK Crvena zvezda season
 2021–22 KK Partizan season

 2020–21 domestic competitions
  2021–22 Basketball Championship of Bosnia and Herzegovina
  2021–22 HT Premijer liga
  2021–22 Prva A liga
  2021–22 Basketball League of Serbia
  2021–22 Slovenian Basketball League

References 

 
2021-22
Adriatic 1
2021–22 in Serbian basketball
2021–22 in Slovenian basketball
2021–22 in Croatian basketball
2021–22 in Bosnia and Herzegovina basketball
2021–22 in Montenegrin basketball